"Till" is a popular song with music by Charles Danvers and English lyrics by Carl Sigman, released in January 1957 by Percy Faith. It was derived from the French song "Prière Sans Espoir", released in 1956 by Lucien Lupi on the EP L'Amour Viendra with original French lyrics written by Pierre Benoit Buisson. Italian singer Caterina Valente released a version in 1960 with lyrics by Gaiano.

Notable cover versions
Percy Faith — number 63 on the Billboard charts (1957)
Roger Williams — number 22 on the Billboard charts (1957), and gold record 
Gina Lollobrigida (1958)
Shirley Bassey — number 14 on the UK Singles Chart from the album Shirley Bassey (1961)
Tony Bennett — number 35 on the UK Singles Chart (1961)
The Angels — number 14 on the Billboard charts as Til" (1961)
The Vogues — number 27 on the Billboard charts (1968) from the album Till (1969)
Dorothy Squires — number 25 on the UK Singles Chart (1970)
Tom Jones — number 2 on the UK Singles Chart, number 41 on the Billboard charts (1971)

References

1956 songs
1957 singles
1961 singles
1962 singles
1966 singles
1968 singles
1971 singles
Songs written by Carl Sigman
Tom Jones (singer) songs
Tony Bennett songs
The Angels (American group) songs
Andy Williams songs
Caterina Valente songs
Dick and Dee Dee songs
Dorothy Squires songs
Warner Records singles
President Records singles
Song recordings produced by Dick Glasser